Hawk's Nest or Hawks Nest may refer to:

Hawks Nest, New South Wales, a small coastal village in Australia
Hawk's Nest, New York, a scenic overlook near Port Jervis, New York, US
Hawks Nest (Sullivan County, New York), a mountain
Hawks Nest, West Virginia, a recreation area in Hawks Nest State Park near Ansted, West Virginia, US
Hawk's Nest (novel), a 1941 novel by Hubert Skidmore
The Hawk's Nest, a 1928 American lost film directed by Benjamin Christensen